Nghĩa Trung may refer to several places in Vietnam, including:

Nghĩa Trung, Đắk Nông, a ward of Gia Nghĩa
, a rural commune of Bù Đăng District
, a rural commune of Nghĩa Đàn District
, a rural commune of Nghĩa Hưng District
, a rural commune of Tư Nghĩa District
Nghĩa Trung, Bắc Giang, a rural commune of Việt Yên District